Roary may refer to:

Roary the Florida Panther,  mascot of college football team of the FIU Golden Panthers in Miami, Florida
Roary, mascot of American football team Detroit Lions
Roary the Lion, club mascot of English football club Middlesbrough F.C. 
Roary the Lion, mascot of the English Cricket Board.
Roary the Rover, mascot of Scottish football club Raith Rovers F.C.
Roary (Beanie Baby), a Beanie Baby lion produced by Ty, Inc.
Roary the Racing Car, an animated children's television show.
Roary, full name Roar E. Saurus, a puppet character from Blue's Room
Roary the Lion, a piano-playing Audio-Animatronics lion who sings different songs and was owned by Mannetron
Roary, an ambient music artist based in Nashville, Tennessee